Feodor Ingvar Kamprad (30 March 1926 – 27 January 2018) was a Swedish billionaire  best known for founding IKEA, a multinational retail company specialising in furniture. He lived in Switzerland from 1976 to 2014.

Early life and family
Kamprad was born in Pjätteryd (now part of Älmhult Municipality), Kronobergs län, in Småland, Sweden, to Feodor Kamprad (1893–1984) and Berta Linnea Matilda Nilsson (1903–1956). His mother was of Swedish origin, while his father was born in Germany and came to Sweden at age one with his parents. Kamprad's paternal grandfather Achim Erdmann Kamprad was originally from Altenburger Land in Thuringia, and his paternal grandmother Franzisca ("Fanny") Glatz was born in Radonitz (Radonice) in Bohemia in then-Austria-Hungary; they left Germany for Sweden in 1896.

The surname Kamprad is a variant of "Kamerade" ("Comrade") and dates back to the 14th century; in the 19th century the Kamprad family had become wealthy estate owners in Thuringia. Achim Kamprad's mother was a distant relative of Paul von Hindenburg.  Achim was the younger son of an estate owner and had bought the farm Elmtaryd (presently standardized Älmtaryd) near the small village of Agunnaryd (now part of Ljungby Municipality) in the province of Småland; with 449 hectares of land it was the largest farm in the area. He committed suicide a few years after Frans Feodor was born, leaving the farm to Franzisca and with time Franz Feodor. Ingvar Kamprad lived on the farm with his parents, sister and grandmother from the age of 6.

Kamprad visited his family's ancestral town in Thuringia and kept in contact with relatives there.

Career

Kamprad began to develop a business as a young boy.  He started selling matches at the age of five. When he was seven he began travelling further afield on his bicycle to peddle to neighbours. He found he could buy matches in bulk very cheaply in Stockholm, sell them individually at a low price, and still make a good profit. From matches he expanded to selling fish, Christmas tree decorations, seeds, and later ballpoint pens and pencils. When Kamprad was 17, his father gave him a cash reward for succeeding in his studies.

Ingvar attended Gothenburg's Handelsinstitut, now part of Hvitfeldtska Gymnasiet, from 1943 to 1945. In 1943, when he was 17 Kamprad founded IKEA at his uncle Ernst's kitchen table. In 1948, Kamprad diversified his portfolio, adding furniture. His business was mostly mail order. The acronym IKEA is made up of the initials of his name (Ingvar Kamprad) plus those of Elmtaryd, the family farm where he was born, and the nearby village Agunnaryd where he was raised.

In June 2013, Kamprad resigned from the board of Inter IKEA Holding SA and his youngest son Mathias Kamprad replaced Per Ludvigsson as the chairman of the holding company. Following his decision to step down the then-87-year-old founder explained, "I see this as a good time for me to leave the board of Inter IKEA Group. By that we are also taking another step in the generation shift that has been ongoing for some years." Mathias and his two older brothers, who also have leadership roles at IKEA, work on the corporation's overall vision and long-term strategy.

Net worth and Stichting INGKA Foundation 
The Dutch-registered Stichting INGKA Foundation is named after Ingvar Kamprad (i.e., ING + KA) which owns INGKA Holding, the parent company for all IKEA stores. In May 2006 the charitable foundation was reported by The Economist  to be the world's wealthiest charity, however the Bill & Melinda Gates Foundation has since become larger. Despite its large endowment its primary purpose is corporate tax-minimisation and anti-takeover protection for IKEA. Kamprad was chairman of the foundation.

According to an article in the Swedish business weekly Veckans Affärer in 2004, Kamprad was one of the world's wealthiest people. This report was based on the assumption that he owned the entire company, an approach both IKEA and the Kamprad family rejected. Kamprad retained little direct ownership in the company, having transferred his interest to Stichting INGKA Foundation and INGKA Holding as part of a complex tax sheltering scheme that leaves his actual degree of control vague.

In March 2010, Forbes magazine estimated Kamprad's fortune at US$23 billion, making him the eleventh richest person in the world. A year later, he fell to 162nd after his lawyers produced documents proving that the foundation he established and heads in Liechtenstein owns IKEA, and that its bylaws bar him and his family from benefiting from its funds. In June 2015, Kamprad was listed as the eighth wealthiest person in the world in the Bloomberg Billionaires Index, with an estimated net worth of $58.7 billion. Forbes reported Kamprad's net worth as of March 2015 to be $3.5 billion.

Works 
While generally a private person, Kamprad had published a few notable works. He first detailed his philosophies of frugality and simplicity in a manifesto entitled A Testament of a Furniture Dealer in 1976.

Kamprad also worked with Swedish journalist Bertil Torekull on Leading by Design: The IKEA Story. In the autobiographical book, Kamprad further describes his philosophies and the trials and triumphs of the founding of IKEA.

Fascist involvement 
In 1994, the personal letters of the Swedish fascist Per Engdahl were made public, posthumously revealing that Kamprad had joined Engdahl's pro-fascist New Swedish Movement (Nysvenska Rörelsen) in 1942, at age 16.  Kamprad had raised funds and recruited members for the group, at least as late as September 1945. When he quit the group is unknown, but he remained a friend of Engdahl until the early 1950s.

Kamprad devoted two chapters to his time in Nysvenska Rörelsen in his book Leading by Design: The IKEA Story and, in a 1994 letter to IKEA employees, called his affiliation with the organization the "greatest mistake of my life". Kamprad explained his teenage engagement in New Swedish Movement as being politically influenced by his father and grandmother in Sudet-Germany. In 2011, journalist Elisabeth Åsbrink published a book Made in Sweden: How the Swedes Are Not Nearly So Egalitarian, Tolerant, Hospitable or Cozy As They Would Like to (Have You) Think in which she revealed that, by 1943, the Swedish Security Service had created a file on Kamprad entitled "Nazi", and that Kamprad had told her, during a 2010 interview, that "Per Engdahl is a great man, and I will maintain that as long as I live."

Writing in The Daily Telegraph, in August 2011, Richard Orange noted that the 1943 file proved for the first time that Kamprad "was an active member of Svensk Socialistisk Samling – successor to the Swedish Nationalist Socialist Workers Party – citing his membership number: 4013. It quotes letters intercepted from Mr Kamprad, then 17, in which he enthuses about recruiting new members and says that he "misses no opportunity to work for the movement." Orange added, "The secret service concluded that, as Mr Kamprad received the party's youth newspaper, he must have held "some sort of official position within the organisation." The following day, the BBC reported: "A Swedish expert on far-right extremism, Anna-Lena Lodenius, told Radio Sweden that Mr Kamprad's Nazi involvement could no longer be dismissed as the by-product of an accidental friendship with Per Engdahl. His involvement in another fascist organisation, she said, showed he must have been 'perfectly aware' of what it stood for." The BBC report also noted that a spokesman said that Kamprad "had long admitted flirting with fascism, but that now, "there are no Nazi-sympathising thoughts in Ingvar's head whatsoever."

Personal life 
Kamprad and his first wife Kerstin Wadling adopted a daughter, Annika. In the 1960s, Kamprad married his second wife, Margaretha Kamprad-Stennert (1940–2011), whom he met when she was twenty years old. They had three sons: Peter, Jonas and Mathias.

He lived in Épalinges, Switzerland, from 1976 to 2014. Kamprad moved back to Småland in Sweden in March 2014 after nearly forty years away. While working with furniture manufacturers in Poland earlier in his career, Kamprad became an alcoholic. In 2004, he said that his drinking was under control, and according to The New York Times, Kamprad "controlled it by drying out three times a year".

According to a 2006 interview, Kamprad was then driving a 1993 Volvo 240, flew economy class, and encouraged IKEA employees to use both sides of a page when writing or printing. He reportedly recycled tea bags and was known to keep the salt and pepper packets in restaurants.  Kamprad had also been known to visit IKEA for a "cheap meal", and was known for his frugal behaviour; purchasing wrapping paper and presents in post-Christmas sales. The company he created is still known for the attention it gives to cost control, operational details and continuous product development; allowing it to lower its prices by an average of 2–3% over the decade to 2010, whilst continuing its global expansion. Kamprad explains his social philosophy in his Testament of a Furniture Dealer: "It is not only for cost reasons that we avoid the luxury hotels. We don't need flashy cars, impressive titles, uniforms or other status symbols. We rely on our strength and our will!" Kamprad owned a villa in Switzerland, a large country estate in Sweden and a vineyard in Provence, France. Kamprad drove a Porsche for several years.

Kamprad had named his sons as the sole heirs of an entity called the Ikano Group, which is valued at US$1.5 billion. His adopted daughter Annika was planned to receive about $300,000.

Death
Kamprad died in his sleep of pneumonia at his home in Småland, Sweden, on 27 January 2018 at the age of 91. According to his will, half of Kamprad's estate would go to projects in Norrland, the sparsely populated northern half of Sweden. Kamprad reportedly wanted to develop Norrland and make it possible for young people to live there.

See also 

The World's Billionaires

References

External links 

Ingvar Kamprad, Founder of Ikea and Creator of a Global Empire, Dies at 91 by Robert D. McFadden. New York Times obituary October 28, 2018
Ingvar Kampra Founder of Ikea, the home-furnishing giant, who made a fortune from flat-pack furniture and meatballs, but lived a simple life The Times obituary October 29, 2018 
Ingvar Kamprad: IKEA Founder and One of the World's Richest Men by Scott Allen, at LiveAbout 05/30/19

1926 births
2018 deaths
Deaths from pneumonia in Sweden
People from Älmhult Municipality
Swedish people of German descent
Swedish people of Czech descent
Swedish expatriates in Switzerland
Swedish company founders
Swedish businesspeople in retailing
Swedish billionaires
IKEA people